The Men's madison competition at the 2017 World Championships was held on 16 April 2017.

Results
200 laps (50km) with 20 sprints were raced.

References

Men's madison
UCI Track Cycling World Championships – Men's madison